David Bauer (born Herman Bernard Waldman, 6 March 1917 – 8 February 1973) was an American actor, a Chicagoan, who was based primarily in Britain.

Early life
He was chosen as the most promising actor at Washington University and his professional career began immediately after graduating. Plays in which he appeared included A Sound of Hunting, The Inspector General, Volpone, The Iceman Cometh and Children of Darkness. He appeared as Doc in the London stage production of West Side Story at Her Majesty's Theatre. Though born in the United States, he left his native country due to McCarthyism and settled in Britain.

Career
He appeared in The Baron, The Champions (where he provided opening narration for each episode), The Avengers, Department S, Gideon's Way, Jason King, The Prisoner, The Protectors, Randall and Hopkirk (Deceased), The Saint, Strange Report, and Undermind.

He appeared in films such as Patton, Inspector Clouseau, Diamonds Are Forever, You Only Live Twice, and The Spy Who Came in from the Cold.

In light of his reasons for leaving the United States for Britain, "Living in Harmony", the episode of The Prisoner in which he appeared as The Judge/Number Two, was banned in the series' original run on American television, supposedly due to drug use but more likely because of the political commentary on the Vietnam War that could be read into the episode.

Personal life
Bauer was married to British actress Stella Tanner until his death in 1973.

Credits confusion
Bauer worked in Hollywood under the name David Wolfe until being blacklisted. As a result, the Internet Movie Database and other online sources confuse many of his film credits with fictional actor David Wolfe.

Filmography

References

External links

1917 births
1973 deaths
American male film actors
American male television actors
American expatriate male actors in the United Kingdom
Male Spaghetti Western actors
Male actors from Chicago
Washington University in St. Louis alumni
20th-century American male actors
American emigrants to England